The 2019 Launceston Tennis International was a professional tennis tournament played on hard courts. It was the fifth (men) and eighth (women) editions of the tournament which was part of the 2019 ATP Challenger Tour and the 2019 ITF Women's World Tennis Tour. It took place in Launceston, Tasmania, Australia between 28 January and 3 February 2019.

Men's singles main-draw entrants

Seeds

 1 Rankings are as of 14 January 2019.

Other entrants
The following players received wildcards into the singles main draw:
  Harry Bourchier
  Jacob Grills
  Rinky Hijikata
  Christopher O'Connell
  Andrew Whittington

The following players received entry into the singles main draw using protected rankings:
  Daniel Altmaier
  Daniel Nguyen

The following players received entry into the singles main draw using their ITF World Tennis Ranking:
  Steven Diez
  David Pérez Sanz
  Jordi Samper Montaña
  Alexander Zhurbin

The following players received entry from the qualifying draw:
  Alessandro Bega
  Yuta Shimizu

Women's singles main-draw entrants

Seeds

 1 Rankings are as of 14 January 2019.

Other entrants
The following players received wildcards into the singles main draw:
  Kaylah McPhee
  Abbie Myers
  Belinda Woolcock

The following player received entry using a protected ranking:
  Nadia Podoroska

The following players received entry from the qualifying draw:
  Alison Bai
  Naiktha Bains
  Chang Kai-chen
  Leylah Annie Fernandez
  Maddison Inglis
  Isabelle Wallace

Champions

Men's singles

 Lloyd Harris def.  Lorenzo Giustino 6–2, 6–2.

Women's singles

 Elena Rybakina def.  Irina Khromacheva, 7–5, 3–3, ret.

Men's doubles

 Max Purcell /  Luke Saville def.  Hiroki Moriya /  Mohamed Safwat 7–5, 6–4.

Women's doubles

 Chang Kai-chen /  Hsu Ching-wen def.  Alexandra Bozovic /  Isabelle Wallace, 6–2, 6–4

References

External links
 2019 Launceston Tennis International at ITFtennis.com
 Official website

2019 ATP Challenger Tour
2019 ITF Women's World Tennis Tour
2019 in Australian tennis
Launceston Tennis International
January 2019 sports events in Australia
February 2019 sports events in Australia